The 2011 Rafael Nadal tennis season officially began on January 2 with the start of the 2011 ATP World Tour.

Calendar

The January–June tournaments listed on Nadal's calendar at his official site as of 4 January 2011.

Year summary

All matches

Singles

Source (ATP)

Doubles

See also
2011 Roger Federer tennis season
2011 Novak Djokovic tennis season

References

External links 
 
ATP tour profile

 
Rafael Nadal tennis seasons
Nadal season